Glyphidomarptis is a genus of moths of the family Crambidae. It contains only one species, Glyphidomarptis cyphoplaca, which is found in the Democratic Republic of Congo.

References

Pyraustinae
Taxa named by Edward Meyrick
Monotypic moth genera
Moths of Africa
Crambidae genera